The Kerry Gow is a 1912 American silent film produced by Kalem Company and distributed by General Films. It was directed by Sidney Olcott with Alice Hollister and Jack J. Clark in the leading roles.

Cast
 Alice Hollister - Nora Drew
 Jack J. Clark - Dan O'Hara
 J.P. McGowan - Valentine Hay
 Robert Vignola - Darby O'Drive
 Jack Melville - Jack Drew
 Eddie O'Sullivan - Patrick Drew
 Sidney Olcott - Captain Kiernan
 George Lester - Major Gruff
 Sonny O'Sullivan - Dinny Doyle
 Helen Lindroth - Alice Doyle

Production notes
The film was shot in Beaufort, County Kerry, Ireland, during the summer of 1912.

References

 Michel Derrien, Aux origines du cinéma irlandais: Sidney Olcott, le premier oeil, TIR 2013.

External links

 The Kerry Gow website dedicated to Sidney Olcott

1912 films
Silent American drama films
American silent short films
Films set in Ireland
Films shot in Ireland
Films directed by Sidney Olcott
1912 short films
1912 drama films
American black-and-white films
1910s American films